The Dean of the United States House of Representatives is the longest continuously serving member of the House. The current dean is Hal Rogers, a Republican Party U.S. Representative from Kentucky, who has served in the House since 1981. The dean is a symbolic post whose only customary duty is to swear in a speaker of the House after they are elected. This responsibility was first recorded in 1819 but has not been observed continuously – at times, the speaker-elect was the current dean or the speaker-elect preferred to be sworn in by a member of their own party when the dean belonged to another party. The dean comes forward on the House Floor to administer the oath to the speaker-elect, before the new speaker then administers the oath to the other members.

While deans perform the swearing-in ceremony for the newly elected speaker, they do not preside over the election of a speaker, as do the Father of the House of Commons of the United Kingdom and the dean of the Canadian House of Commons (that duty falls to the previous House's Clerk). 

Because of other privileges associated with seniority, the dean is usually allotted some of the most desirable office space, and is generally either chair or ranking minority member of an influential committee.

It is unclear when the position first achieved concrete recognition, though the seniority system and increasing lengths of service emerged in the early 20th century. As late as 1924, Frederick H. Gillett was dean, and also speaker, before becoming a senator. Modern deans move into their positions so late in their careers that a move to the Senate is highly unlikely. When Ed Markey broke Gillett's record for time in the House before moving to the Senate in 2013 he was still decades junior to the sitting dean.

The deanship can change hands unexpectedly. In the 1952 election, Adolph J. Sabath became the first Representative elected to a 24th term, breaking the record of 23 terms first set by former Speaker Joseph Gurney Cannon, whose service had been non-consecutive, whereas Sabath's was not. North Carolina's Robert L. Doughton had not contested that election as he was retiring at the age of 89 years and two months, a House age record broken in 1998 by Sidney R. Yates, and again by Ralph Hall in 2012. However, Sabath died before the new term began and Doughton was dean for the old term's final months before Speaker Sam Rayburn became dean in the new Congress.

Claude Pepper, who died early in his final term in 1989, held the record for oldest winner of a House election until Hall broke it in 2012.

In 1994, Texas Democrat Jack Brooks was defeated by Steve Stockman in the year he was expected to succeed Jamie Whitten as dean.

List of deans of the House
Years as dean are followed by name, party, state, and start of service in Congress.

All the members of the First Congress had equal seniority (as defined for the purpose of this article), but Muhlenberg, as the speaker, was the first member to be sworn in. Muhlenberg, Hartley and Thatcher were among the 13 members who attended the initial meeting of the House on March 4, 1789.

In the eighteenth and nineteenth centuries, some state delegations to the House were often not elected until after the term had begun. To avoid confusion, this fact is ignored in the list below.

Notes

See also
 Dean of the United States Senate
 Father of the House, the international equivalent in many countries; originally coined in the House of Commons of the United Kingdom
 List of members of the United States Congress by longevity of service

References

External links
House.gov page "Deans/Fathers of the House"

Leaders of the United States House of Representatives
Senior legislators
Lists related to the United States House of Representatives